Kwanyinaspis is a genus of arthropod from the Cambrian aged Chengjiang biota of Yunnan, China. It was described in 2005 based on a single specimen, ELI-2004001. Around 6 cm long, It has twelve trunk tergites  with well developed posterior facing pleural spines, along with a tail spine and ventral eyes. In the original description, it was tenatively considered a member of Aglaspidida. However, later studies have considered it a trilobitomorph, and possibly the closest known relative of trilobites.

References 

Artiopoda
Prehistoric arthropod genera